Dorcadion laeve is a species of beetle in the family Cerambycidae. It was described by Faldermann in 1837. It is known from Iran, Armenia, and Turkey.

Subspecies
 Dorcadion laeve hyrcanum Jakovlev, 1900
 Dorcadion laeve laeve Faldermann, 1837
 Dorcadion laeve micula Plavilstshikov, 1937
 Dorcadion laeve vladimiri Danilevsky & Murzin, 2009

References

laeve
Beetles described in 1837